Zermezeele is a commune in the Nord department in northern France.

The northern border between Ledringhem and Zermezeele is marked by the river Peene Becque.

Population

Heraldry

See also
Communes of the Nord department

References

Communes of Nord (French department)
French Flanders